Ambrus Nagy (20 August 1927 – 18 July 1991) was a Hungarian fencer. He won a silver medal in the team épée event at the 1956 Summer Olympics.

References

External links
 

1927 births
1991 deaths
Hungarian male épée fencers
Olympic fencers of Hungary
Fencers at the 1956 Summer Olympics
Olympic silver medalists for Hungary
Martial artists from Budapest
Olympic medalists in fencing
Medalists at the 1956 Summer Olympics
20th-century Hungarian people